The music of the Marvel Cinematic Universe (MCU) covers the soundtracks of the American media franchise and shared universe, which is centered on a series of superhero films produced by Marvel Studios. The films are based on characters that appear in American comic books published by Marvel Comics. The soundtracks include the original scores composed by various composers for the films and television series of the franchise, as well as the songs that are heard in each film.

Ramin Djawadi provided the first MCU music with his original score for Iron Man in 2008. Alan Silvestri was the first composer to work on multiple MCU films, while Brian Tyler was the first composer to reference the work of another MCU composer when he quoted Silvestri's "Captain America March" in his score for Thor: The Dark World (2013) and he composed the previous fanfare for the Marvel Studios production logo from 2013 to 2016. Michael Giacchino has scored five MCU films, the most for any composer in the franchise, and composed the fanfare that has been used for the Marvel Studios production logo since 2016. Original music has also been composed for the Marvel One-Shots short film series and other related MCU projects, and original songs have been created specifically for use in the franchise.

The scores for every MCU film and television series have received album releases, and several compilation albums featuring existing songs used in the films have also been released. Critical response to the MCU's music has been mixed, with focus placed on a lack of memorable themes compared to other large media franchises and on the lack of continuity between works. Some critics have shown more appreciation for the work of more traditional composers like Silvestri, and for Tyler's attempts to establish a consistent tone and thematic continuity for the franchise.

Feature films

Phase One

Iron Man

Ramin Djawadi had been a fan of the character Iron Man as a child, saying that he always liked superheroes "that actually don’t have any superpowers". After Iron Man director Jon Favreau's previous collaborator John Debney was unavailable to score the film, Djawadi sought out the role himself. Filming on Iron Man had already been completed by the time Djawadi joined the production, and rather than wait until he could see the completed film, as he usually would, Djawadi began "playing with ideas" as soon as he saw the first trailer. Due to time constraints and the final cut of the film changing until "the last possible minute", Djawadi had help with arrangements and additional cues from Hans Zimmer and Remote Control Productions. Rage Against the Machine guitarist Tom Morello, who makes a cameo appearance in the film, contributed guitar performances to the score.

Favreau had a clear vision of heavy metal music and guitars for the project, saying that Tony Stark was more of a rock star than a traditional superhero, and "there’s Spider-Man, Batman and all these superhero movies. This superhero movie’s different. I want to do something completely different, instead of going down the orchestral route. I want to do more rock and roll." Djawadi subsequently composed most of the film's score on guitar, before arranging it for orchestra. Djawadi composed several themes for the character of Tony Stark, representing his different moods and attitudes, all inspired by Robert Downey, Jr.'s performance. Other themes for the film are "not so much character based, but rather plot based that carry you through the movie". Musicians John O'Brien and Rick Boston, frequent collaborators with Favreau, provided a big band-style arrangement of the Iron Man theme song from the 1966 cartoon The Marvel Super Heroes for a scene where Stark attends a casino.

The Incredible Hulk
Director Louis Leterrier's first choice for composer on The Incredible Hulk was Craig Armstrong, once the arranger for Massive Attack, a band Leterrier was fond of and had collaborated with on the 2005 film Unleashed; this choice had surprised Marvel, who often had directors asking for the likes of John Williams or Danny Elfman, and the studio was hesitant due to Armstrong's lack of experience writing for action films. Leterrier listened to Armstrong's previous music while planning and editing the film, and music editor Peter Myles used Armstrong's work and similar music by others in the film's temp score. Armstrong chose not to listen to the temp, or watch Ang Lee's Hulk, before composing the score, which he began in his home in Glasgow, Scotland, before moving to Remote Control in Los Angeles to be closer to the production. The score was recorded in four days, resulting in little time for adjustments on the day, forcing Armstrong to "create very specific demos" that were "completely accurate" for Matt Dunkley to orchestrate. Leterrier favored an orchestral sound over electronics, "because he didn’t want the work to sound dated so quickly", though Armstrong did electronically enhance a lot of the orchestral recordings. Additionally, "about half the score" features various ethnic instruments performed by Pete Lockett.

When Armstrong first began working in Glasgow, he did so with three sequences which he called "the keys to opening up" the score: the Abomination and the Hulk's alley fight, "which was complex because of its choreography"; Bruce Banner and Betty Ross' reunion, "the romantic element of the score"; and the Hulk and Betty in the cave, which "combines The Hulk Theme and when Hulk and Betty are together, so the Bruce and Betty Theme was totally different than my music for The Hulk and Betty". For the Hulk's theme, Armstrong compared it to Williams' main theme for Jaws, with "simple notation" that "summed up the complete concept". The theme features a bass C note, with string glissandos up an octave and then back down to the original note. Other themes include Bruce Banner's theme, for "when he’s alone and searching for the cure"; two theme's for the Abomination, a dark one for the soldier Emil Blonsky and a more aggressive one for when he becomes a monster himself (the latter is combined with the Hulk theme when those character's fight); the love theme for Banner and Betty Ross; and a scientific theme, for "when they are trying to crack the codes of the Hulk". Joe Harnell's "The Lonely Man" theme for the 1978 The Incredible Hulk television series is briefly quoted in the cue "Bruce Goes Home", with Armstrong playing the piano for the piece himself.

Iron Man 2
For the sequel to Iron Man, Debney returned to work with Favreau, replacing Djawadi as composer. Debney called his score for Iron Man 2 "quite different in many ways from the last score. This score while employing much guitar and more contemporary elements, it is also much bigger and darker in tone and scope." He described his music as "Led Zeppelin with an orchestra", and elaborated that "The two scores share a common pedigree [of rock-and-roll and electric guitar] but are generally different. They are different scores with different results." Debney was not influenced by the AC/DC soundtrack for the film, feeling that "the songs and score play two very different roles in the film", and unlike the previous score he used a large choir for some of the film's more dramatic moments. Morello returned to again contribute guitar performances for the film, this time collaborating with Debney to write some of the music itself, with Debney first composing the score, and then working with Morello on the guitar parts and "textures".

Debney called Iron Man 2 "odd in that there were not a lot of places where a true superhero theme could be played. Tony Stark is uber cool even as Iron Man, so, musically, we couldn’t state a full-blown superhero theme. The strains of Iron Man’s theme are heard only in a few spots by design. I’m hoping with future films, Iron Man might get his full-blown theme played aggressively." For instance, Debney recorded several different versions of the score for scenes where Stark puts on the Iron Man suit, each with "different portions of the theme fleshed out or left out". What was ultimately chosen "was less thematic. It was sort of a groove with a little bit of French horn. Maybe that was the right choice, but it was a difficult decision. It was difficult to find the areas in the movie where we could let Tony be a superhero." He continued, "There were moments where I wanted to play a scene broadly or make a love scene out of it but we were never able to go there", such as for the end of the film where "Tony finally kisses Pepper ... there were a couple of versions I did that were really gorgeous and lush but it just didn't fit. It's a different kind of movie because they kiss and then all of a sudden the mood is broken. It's just the nature of this character." Debney felt that this process led to the score being "watered down and mashed up a little bit" from what he originally intended. However, Debney did not feel the same about his music for the villain, Ivan Vanko, which he described as a personal "joy". He said that Favreau "gave me a great opportunity to get into [the opening] scene and learn [Vanko]'s circumstances and to play sincerely sad music for him and the relationship he had with his father. Jon gave me the opportunity to morph that and turn it into something really dark and twisted. For me that was the most satisfactory part of the score and the film". For Vanko's theme, the choir sang in Russian to "capture the dark Russian soul" of the character.

Thor
Director Kenneth Branagh's frequent composing collaborator Patrick Doyle called Thor "the most commercially high profile film I have done since Frankenstein", and noted that "Marvel Studios have a brand in Thor. Their interest, like mine, was for strong thematic material that would capture the essence of that brand." Branagh and Doyle wanted the score to have a contemporary feel, while Doyle "was also eager for the score to contain a strong sense of melody, which [Branagh] responds to in my work. He was keen, as indeed I was, that the grand images were not in any way hyperbolized, and that there would be a balance between playing with, and against the images." To distinguish between the realms of Asgard and Earth musically, Doyle used "broader orchestral strokes and thicker orchestration" to depict the grandeur and beauty of Asgard, and more "contemporary, electronic and percussion driven" music for the Earth scenes, incorporating the then-popular ostinato technique "in a symphonic way whenever appropriate".

Doyle took inspiration for the score from his own Celtic background, which he described as "very intertwined" with the Norse mythology that Thor is based on, as well as the works of Richard Wagner. He found the main challenge of the score to be composing a "superhero theme" for the titular character, and a second main theme representing Asgard, the latter of which Doyle wanted "to come across as an old folk song from a Celtic world". He noted that the Asgard theme develops throughout the film to also represent traveling, action, and fighting. Of the other themes he composed for the film, Doyle also noted a theme for Jotunheim, another world visited in the film. On specific instrumentation for the character of Thor, Doyle jokingly noted that a piccolo would be inappropriate, and that a character with such a big personality and physicality required "a slightly more robust set of musical instruments: horns, low brass, slow strings etc." To represent the character's longing for home after he is banished from Asgard to Earth, Doyle used a cor anglais, which he felt also captured Thor's pathos and nobility.

Captain America: The First Avenger

By February 2011, Marvel chose Alan Silvestri to provide the score for Captain America: The First Avenger after composing the "iconic scores" for Back to the Future and Forrest Gump, over a number of other composers including Michael Giacchino, John Powell, and Henry Jackman. Silvestri then met with director Joe Johnston to spot the film, and had seven and a half weeks to compose the score. Johnston wanted a full orchestral score "to allow for movement" between the film's two genres: a period piece and a futuristic, high-tech sci-fi film. Silvestri noted the appropriateness of the fact that his style of music, which he describes as "romantically heroic", is often described by others as "patriotic", as well as his tendency to use brass instruments, which can "compete sonically and give the music some kind of presence where it might not have any", something necessary during the film's action sequences.

In Silvestri's first meeting with Johnston, the latter raised his desire for a central theme. On this, Silvestri said, "To have some kind of musical signature either for a character or some aspect of the film, truly holds the score together. A theme makes the music feel like one piece in a sense." For this central theme, a fanfare for Captain America, Silvestri did not look to any past film scores in particular, instead looking to "certain kinds of elements that we have, over time, associated with that kind of heroic statement", such as the percussive elements, intervals, and brass instrumentation of Aaron Copland's "Fanfare for the Common Man". He noted that Captain America is a "very bold and bombastic idea, so you don’t need to inflate that in any way. But that doesn’t mean you have to play those elements down either", adding that he felt Captain America was fleshed out more as a character simply by facing "a really bad guy" in the Red Skull in a similar way to Luke Skywalker's development in the presence of Darth Vader. On the Red Skull himself, Silvestri looked to take the character seriously and "play him as bad", but allowed for more compassion for the character when he talks about his tortured past. He also introduced a theme for the Tesseract, Red Skull's energy source.

The Avengers
In November 2011, Marvel announced that Silvestri would return to compose the score for the crossover film Marvel's The Avengers. Silvestri found it helpful to have already been part of the "Marvel process", which gave him a "sense of how Marvel treats their characters, cares for them, and a bit of what that Marvel post-production process feels like". Director Joss Whedon preferred an "old-school ... old-fashioned" score to using pre-existing songs, which he felt makes "the moment [become] about the song". He called Silvestri "letter perfect for this movie because he can give you the heightened emotion ... but he can also be extraordinarily cue and character specific, which I love." Silvestri did not want the score to have the same "military" feeling as Captain America: The First Avengerss, as Stark says in the film "We’re not soldiers." However, Whedon did want aspects of the film to resemble a war film, and "there are times where [the Avengers are] absolutely functioning as this paramilitary unit", so Silvestri did add some "military seasoning" in places. Both Whedon and Silvestri wanted the score to build throughout the film, to climax in the final battle. For the aftermath of that fight, Silvestri uses a simple guitar piece to give the audience a rest with a "complete sonic break" from what comes before in the film. He then segues back into the full orchestra for the end of the film. For a sequence where the villain Loki attacks while a string quartet plays Franz Schubert's String Quartet No. 13 in A minor, the editors had already overlaid the piece with a temp track for when Loki "starts to do his thing". Silvestri expanded on this for the final score, having the music transition from the onscreen quartet to the entire orchestra playing the same piece when the fighting begins.

On composing for a film with such a large cast, Silvestri said, "I’ve worked on films where there have been a number of stars and certainly worked on films where there have been characters of equal weight in terms of their level of importance and profile in the film, but this one is somewhat extreme in that regard because each of these characters has their own world ... the film is really about the coming together of these characters, which implies that there is this entity called the Avengers which really has to be representative of all of them together." Later elaborating on this, Silvestri said, "We knew that if we were to have a theme for every character in this movie, the music would get very clunky and intrusive. So I stayed away from all of that." Instead, Marvel and Whedon wanted a central, definable "Avengers" theme for the film, which Silvestri wanted to have a heroic aspect and a grandness, but also be "generated from that scene when they’re all gathering for the last great battle ... the interesting thing about it as the 'big moment; of the score is that they’re not doing anything. They’re standing there, which allowed me to move away from the idea of it being an action moment." Silvestri did ultimately use some other themes in the score: he developed a motif for Loki as the central villain of the film, a "low, ominous sequence of chords, [used] when his presence is either visible or implied"; he reprised his Captain America theme, for when that character "makes his entrance, or when he’s in the middle of a fight scene ... yet not using it fully" as "a little of his theme goes a long, long way", and his Tesseract theme, including over the opening logos of the film; and midway through Silvestri's work writing the score, Whedon had seen some completed scenes featuring the Black Widow and "wanted to explore music that was a bit more thematic for her", so Silvestri introduced "a lonely, plucked theme with an Eastern European flavor" to define the character. For the other major characters, Silvestri used instrumentation to differentiate their scenes, for instance Iron Man "always has the more contemporary, rhythmic component to a lot of his music."

Phase Two

Iron Man 3
With Iron Man 3 featuring a post-Avengers Tony Stark, Marvel and incoming director Shane Black wanted to move away from the rock sound of the previous Iron Man films, and towards "a score that echoed the classics of super hero film history", for which they approached Brian Tyler, a Marvel fan whose previous music had often been used in temp scores for other films by the studio. Tyler stated that Marvel was interested in him for his more thematic work from the likes of The Greatest Game Ever Played, Annapolis, and Partition, rather than his "modern" action music such as that for The Fast and the Furious films and Battle: Los Angeles, and wanted him to combine the energy of the latter with the sensibilities of the former. In addition to the classic orchestra, Tyler recorded metallic sounds such as anvils being hit to add an element of "iron" to the score. As a nod to the previous Iron Man composer's use of guitars, Tyler added instances of the orchestra performing Black Sabbath-like riffs throughout the film.

Marvel specifically asked Tyler for a new and different, "really identifiable" theme for Iron Man to represent his "serious" new role in the MCU as a "legitimate superhero", which Tyler described as a thematic reboot. To create a "bigger and grander" sound than the previous Iron Man scores, Tyler took influence from the works of John Williams, Alex North, and John Barry, among others. Tyler composed the new theme on piano, but always intended it to be a "march and anthem" with a large brass component. Tyler also used the same theme played on a harp to represent Stark's sad emotional state after he is stranded without the Iron Man suit, and created a "wild 1960s style" arrangement of it for the film's main titles which had reminded Tyler of a typical police series from that era. For the Extremis technology, Tyler wanted a motif with a magical quality as he felt that it was technology so futuristic that it seemed like magic, and so looked to Williams' "The Well of the Souls" cue from Raiders of the Lost Ark for inspiration, giving the motif a spiritual feel. The idea of spirituality also extends to the Mandarin's theme; Tyler noted the ambiguity of the character in terms of ethnicity and culture, and how he appears in the film as a "be-all" terrorist, as well as his role as a fanatical, "quasi-religious leader" comparable to Jim Jones. The theme ultimately combines religious music from multiple cultures—including Monastic, Gothic, and Christian chants and choirs, and sounds from the Middle-East and Asia—and was primarily played on the bansuri and bazantar.

Thor: The Dark World

Branagh chose not to return for the sequel to Thor, and was replaced as director by Alan Taylor. By August 2012, Doyle had discussed potentially returning to score the film with Taylor, however, Taylor's first choice for composer was Carter Burwell, who signed on to Thor: The Dark World by April 2013. A month later, Burwell left the film in what Marvel described as a "creative split", and Tyler signed on to replace him that June. President of Marvel Studios Kevin Feige later explained that Marvel had approved of Taylor's choice based on Burwell's collaborations with the Coen brothers, but the studio ultimately felt that Burwell was not the right fit for the film, and had to make an early decision to replace the composer due to the relatively short time left for post-production on the film; Feige admitted that if there was "time for trial and error, it might have worked" out. Tyler was chosen by Marvel to replace Burwell based on the positive experience the company had working with him on Iron Man 3.

On differentiating his scores for Iron Man 3 and The Dark World, Tyler said that they were at the opposite ends of the "superhero spectrum", and so even though he used full orchestras for both, "the actual writing of the notes and the harmonies and all that was different." He later elaborated that "The feel of Thor is a very different than Iron Man. Yet they live in the same universe. For me, it’s like somehow Indiana Jones showed up on the Enterprise, or something." Tyler described The Dark World as "science fiction meeting classic medieval war", and saw it as a cross between Star Wars and The Lord of the Rings—"there’s spaceships and lasers ... but within it they wear capes and fight with swords and ride horses ... those were not elements really present as much in the first one. So it required something different. I think my score for Thor: The Dark World would have been out of place in the first film and vice versa." Azam Ali, who collaborated with Tyler on Children of Dune, and Tori Letzler are featured vocalists for the score; Tyler felt that their contributions provided "something emotional" to the score.

Rather than have Tyler reprise Doyle's themes from the first film, Marvel wanted Tyler to create a new, post-Avengers Thor theme as he did for Tony Stark in Iron Man 3. Tyler described his new theme as mature, regal, and epic, and noted that the romantic elements with the character Jane Foster become "kind of melancholy" for the sequel, "because she’s this mortal that he’s fallen for, which could not be further from his side of the train tracks". The theme for Thor evolved from a more "pageant"-like theme that represents Asgard in the film, which has a much more lived-in feeling than it did in the first film. Tyler also introduced a new theme for post-Avengers Loki to reflect his increasingly complicated personality and storyline, performed on a harp to play against expectations. Despite not reprising Doyle's themes, Tyler looked to pay homage to his general style and sound from the first film during quieter moments like dialogue scenes. He also quotes Silvestri's Captain America theme when that character makes a brief cameo appearance.

Captain America: The Winter Soldier
When Henry Jackman was in the running to score Captain America: The First Avenger, he had written "a full-on traditional symphonic, Americana score" as proof-of-concept for Marvel, which he looked to return to when Marvel asked him to score the sequel, Captain America: The Winter Soldier. He felt that Silvestri had used that same style to great effect in the first film, but found that the second film "could not have been more different, and the score was not suitable, so I had to rewrite it". Jackman said of his work on the film, "it’s 50% production and all the tricks I’ve learnt from spending years in the record industry but then it’s also got the kind of injection of symphonic, thematic, heroic music that all kind of merges into one musical, and hopefully coherent piece". He described the film as aesthetically "way closer to something like Dark Knight Rises than it is to say the Richard Donner's Superman, or the traditional, nostalgic superhero film." Some of Silvestri's work from the first film is tracked into the opening of the sequel, which Jackman said "reminds everyone where we left off. This character is about to get hurled into a completely different environment, so it’s a nice way to tie the two films together." Jackman reprises Silvestri's Captain America theme from The First Avenger at the beginning of the film.

Jackman first created three pieces of music for directors Anthony and Joe Russo: a modern Captain America theme; a six-to-seven minute suite for the Winter Soldier; and a track representing Hydra. Concerning Captain America, Jackman struggled to balance having "enough theme so that you’ve got something heroic to cling onto, but not so much that it’s just becoming nostalgic and irrelevant", and stated that in the third act "the more melodic, the more lyrical, the more thematic element [starts] to come through". The one note Feige gave Jackman on the score was asking him to embrace "those moments that are emotional or historical or nostalgic", such as when the character visits his own Smithsonian exhibit. For those, Jackman took some inspiration from the works of Aaron Copland. Jackman described the Winter Soldier as "a mechanized, violent, relentless, nihilistic beast that just destroys everything in its path", so approaching the character in a Wagnerian way would be "inappropriate ... instead [I decided] to embrace it and start exploiting all these other tricks I've learned in working in the record industry and making drum and bass records." In the Winter Soldier suite, "the strings only show up for the last minute. It is violent—it's got screaming and banging and it's dystopian and dysfunctional. Much closer to a modern electronic thing than anything orchestral." Jackman spent ten days just processing vocal recordings to give the theme a sense of "tortured, time-stretched human cries of someone who has been so processed that it's become mechanized at the same time but you can still hear the human in there". He also tried to give the piece an arc, where the human elements get more "revealed toward the end of the film" as Captain America and the audience come to learn who the Winter Soldier is and care about him. When Jackman played the suite for the directors, they loved the unique and non-film music sound, and asked that Jackman not sanitize or water it down for the film—Joe said, "I really want to hear that in the movie and not just 20% of" it. For Hydra, Jackman wanted to move away from the "Wagnerian symphonic baddie music" of the first film, and "come up with a sinister tonality that didn’t feel like the muhahahaha of an arch villain, because the sinister nature of the neo-fascist within the film is modern, credible and politically contemporary." Jackman also introduces a motif for the Falcon.

Guardians of the Galaxy
As he did on his previous films, director James Gunn brought his composer Tyler Bates onto Guardians of the Galaxy in pre-production so Bates could write music ahead of time for Gunn to film to. Gunn provided material such as "pre-video sequences" for Bates to use while writing the music, and then "during action scenes and huge dramatic moments we blare the score on set so that the cast, crew, and camera can move in harmony with the music. Music is often an afterthought in film, but never for us." Bates then re-wrote most of the score once the film was being edited. Bates found the score to be his "most demanding", and explained that "at least half the cues in the movie have more than 500 tracks of audio", consisting of multiple orchestral passes, choirs, overdubs, and other instrumentation. On working in with all of the songs that Gunn put in the film's soundtrack, Bates said, "The music is literally a different personality in the movie, has a different function than the songs. It exists more, not only to be propulsive in the action sequences and to set up some of the comedic moments, but really to underscore the emotional depth of the characters."

Bates said on using themes and motifs in the score, "Very few movies that are made these days are fantastical enough to sustain huge, bold identifiable themes. Even with the majority of the comic-book films, they have a tendency to be steeped in a realism that would be disturbed or interrupted by highly emotive, melodic themes, and it seems like a lot of the stuff going in these films is propulsive and somewhat cold emotionally." He felt that Guardians of the Galaxy did not fit this model, and "unabashedly embraced leitmotifs for the array of cosmic characters" that appear in it. Bates described creating a new main theme for a Marvel franchise as "the most rewarding aspect of stepping into a movie like this". Gunn asked for "something kickass that a 4-year-old would remember", and Bates came up with the theme by "noodling" on an electric guitar. The villain Ronan's theme is quoted in full only once in the film, as Bates and Gunn wanted him to be more serious and scary which they felt would be undermined by a loud, melodic theme. His presence is generally represented with tones "chock full of low-brass" and synths. Bates has "some spongy synthesizers pulsing through" the motif for Groot, which he developed in pre-production. Bates said that he would have infused the score with more of those electronic elements if it was not for the "frenetic working process" on the film.

Avengers: Age of Ultron
After scoring both Iron Man 3 and Thor: The Dark World, Brian Tyler was rumored for several months to be scoring The Avengers sequel Avengers: Age of Ultron, before officially signing on to the film in March 2014. He said that his template for the film was game changing scores such as those for Star Wars, Superman, and Raiders of the Lost Ark, feeling that "You have to build in nostalgia and do it upfront so you can relate to it." In February 2015, Danny Elfman was revealed to have composed additional music for the score, ultimately receiving co-composer credit. On working with Elfman, Tyler said, "The movie is such a large canvas that there were parts that really benefited from his kind of voice. But also, it needed to all fit together and hang together seamlessly, and that was something we worked really hard on doing." Tyler and Elfman strove to orchestrate, record, and mix their music similarly. Tyler wrote much more quiet and emotional music for Age of Ultron "than you would've thought ... you can go deeper in a second movie because in the first movie you really have to set everyone up". He gave Hulk's farewell to Black Widow, Pietro Maximoff's sacrifice, and the time spent at Hawkeye's farm as examples of this.

Tyler stated that his usual approach to taking over a franchise from another composer is to "try to take from what's before me and also forge ahead". So, though Tyler "was really married to" the idea of reprising Silvestri's Avengers theme from the first film in the sequel and wanted to keep in-line with "the language of what Alan had done in The Avengers", he instead began by composing a "classic, epic" suite of his own for the film. Titled "Rise Together", Tyler said that it "is much more about pageantry and a march, and there's a slight militaristic aspect. I tend to stay away from that, but I felt that that, combined with a choir, would make them feel larger than life. And certainly, this is when they're 'rising together,' so you need to have that unifying heroic theme with them." Elfman then took Silvestri's theme and "pulled it into" the new material for the sequel to make a "kind of a hybrid" theme for the film. Tyler also reprised his own Iron Man and Thor themes in the score, as well as previous Captain America material, "in order to create a similar musical universe", especially since those character's post-Avengers solo films "set up" Age of Ultron.

Tyler composed several other new themes for the film, to represent the titular villain Ultron; the relationship that develops between Black Widow and the Hulk; and the new Avenger Vision. Tyler wanted Ultron's theme to sound "almost heroic", since Ultron thinks he is saving the world, "but dissonant and tweaky enough" to reflect that "he doesn't quite have it right" and is still a villain. The melody is simple so that it is easy to remember, but starts flat by one note to make the theme sound slightly "off", is played on two pianos with one of them out of tune, and when the main phrase is repeated the last note is played "ahead by a beat" the second time; "not only out of tune, but out of time." The theme also features an artificially distorted guitar to give it a machine-like tone. Tyler described the Black Widow/Hulk relationship as an "unrequited romance and this kind of sad situation" with "the curse of the Hulk being a barrier between [the two characters] and what they really want. And so that melody, that had to be almost like a lullaby, but broken." Tyler wrote the "lullaby" to be understated, and it is often played on piano or cello. For the Vision's theme, Tyler "wanted to go for something that was underneath and delicate, and had kind of a wispy nature to it, in a sense—and almost towards the romantic". He tried to reflect the character's role as a messianic figure of sorts, and Ultron's intended redemption for Earth, and said, "you don’t really know what side he’s on. You have this guy who’s literally two minutes old and is born in this movie with this knowledge of humanity. It’s Machiavellian in a way." The theme is an adagio that is "not your typical bombast, look how muscley this guy is; it’s more of a mystery." To represent the character's youth and questions about himself, it features string glissandos that constantly change between chords during his introduction, and often momentarily settle on uncertain notes and sounds. Tyler constantly instructed the orchestra to play quieter, "trying to say more with less for Vision". The music for the visions that the Scarlet Witch gives the Avengers pays homage to scores from the 1950s, with Tyler using a "randomly played" vibraphone and strings such as a harp to create a "dreaminess" and "hypnotic effect".

Ant-Man
Steven Price was announced as the composer for Ant-Man by director Edgar Wright, who he had previously worked with, in February 2014, but they both left the film that March. In January 2015, Christophe Beck was hired to score the film, having previously worked with the new director, Peyton Reed. Beck and Reed began experimenting with "high concept" electronic music to create a "glitched out, digital, electronic, skittery score" that could represent the insect and technology aspects of the film, but it was ultimately "too weird and quirky ... almost weird for its own sake". Feige asked that they instead take "the classic symphonic approach with big themes and bold brass", which Beck did with the unique twist of "a sneaky sense of fun since it is, after all, not only a superhero movie, but also a heist comedy." That heist genre gave Beck "a little latitude to use a rhythm section and something a little bit more funky and jazzy and groovy that I wouldn’t otherwise have been able to get away with."

Beck composed two main themes for the film: the Ant-Man superhero theme and a theme for family. In addition to using the traditional brass for the Ant-Man theme, Beck used an alto flute and violas, which he felt had "a little bit of the sound world of the heist movie and the spy movie, the old James Bond sound." For a sequence where Ant-Man surfs down a water pipe on a raft made of ants, Beck began arranging the theme as a "regular action cue" but found it "a little too intense for the scene". Reed wanted it to have more of a sense of fun, and Beck eventually wrote a piece evoking the "classic guitar surf music", but with the orchestra rather than a guitar. The family theme represents the film's two father-daughter relationships, between Scott Lang and his daughter Cassie Lang, and between Hank Pym and his daughter Hope van Dyne. Beck also intended for it to "signify the emergence of Hope as something of a hero herself". Additionally, the villainous Yellowjacket has "a more traditional theme, presented in traditional fashion, but augmented with processed electronics to convey the crazed and obsessed nature of the character". Of the many ant species featured in the film, Reed and Beck felt that the bullet ants deserved their "own identity"; since the species is primarily indigenous to South America, Beck used ancient Aztec drums and tribal flutes to give them a "regional flavor". For a scene where Ant-Man infiltrates the Avengers compound, Beck quotes Silvestri's Avengers theme and Jackman's Falcon motif from Winter Soldier.

Phase Three

Captain America: Civil War
The Russo brothers confirmed in August 2014 that Jackman would return to score Captain America: Civil War. In July 2015, Jackman noted the industrial elements of his Winter Soldier suite from the previous film was an indication of what the new score would sound like, but did caution that "it's just a jumping off point since the Russos are looking for something new—similar with a twist." Once Jackman read the script for the film, he realized that the "movie tonally was so different to the second one ... it’s sort of half Captain America, half an Avengers film in a way" and so Jackman ultimately wrote a much more symphonic and orchestral score than he did for Winter Soldier. This culminates in the final fight between Captain America, Winter Soldier, and Iron Man, the music for which Jackman described as "somewhat operatic and ... almost classical in its style ... some of the harmony and the orchestration really does get quite classical."

Concerning the central conflict of the film, Jackman found that he was in "constant danger of tipping it too much" and pushing the audience to one side or the other, so he composed a new main theme for the film to represent that Civil War, which he called "a generic theme to balance everything out", and "a narrative theme toward which all the characters can gravitate. It wrapped them all up and it helped to bind the movie together rather than do endless disparate themes." The second major theme in the film is a thriller theme, that appears whenever the central mystery surrounding several character's pasts and Zemo's plan is teased or explored. It consists of a flute motif tied to the Winter Soldier's Russian handlers and a rising adagio that represents Zemo's twisted determination, and was inspired by the works of Jerry Goldsmith. Of the character themes from previous films that Jackman did use, "where appropriate", he evolved them to fit the tone and style of the new score. Captain America's theme could not be too prominent or heroic, as that would suggest that he was the hero of the film when the Russos were trying to create an ambiguity surrounding the main conflict—this does change throughout the film though, becoming more heroic when Captain America "turns out to be right all along". For the Winter Soldier, Jackman took a "rising string rhyme" that was buried underneath "the chaos and the industrial stuff" in the end of the character's suite from The Winter Soldier, and developed that into a much more symphonic theme for the character, in keeping with his much more human portrayal in this film.

Jackman also wrote motifs for the major characters introduced in the film: Spider-Man, Black Panther, and Zemo. Spider-Man's motif has a small arc to match that character's few appearances, being introduced very gently as the "somewhat confused, slightly tender" Peter Parker first appears, followed by "the seed of his heroism" when he is recruited for the Avengers, and finally a "full-blown version" plays when he fights alongside the other heroes. For Black Panther, Jackman used a combination of African woodwind instruments whenever the character talks about his ancestors, while muted trombones "brought his character into the grandeur of the symphony orchestra, but there’s a slightly vengeful, serrated sound to muted trombones if you pick the right kind of mood". Zemo's personal theme was performed on "a lot of these rather unusual tuned bells" that gave him an "otherly sound", as well as a cimbalon to represent his Eastern European roots.

Doctor Strange
Having known Kevin Feige for some time, Michael Giacchino spent years working with him on potentially scoring one of Marvel's films. When he heard of development on Doctor Strange, Giacchino was particularly interested in working on the film, feeling that it would have more of an independent film feel than other Marvel films. He contacted Feige, "and that ball just rolled very quickly downhill, and I was on" the film. Giacchino revealed his involvement with Doctor Strange in May 2016. Director Scott Derrickson called the score "magic in the literal sense of the word" and said that Giacchino "is doing what good scorers do, which is he is not just creating music that supports the images, he's adding a third thing to the movie. It becomes something new with his music in there that it didn't have with temp music."

For the score, Giacchino felt no pressure to align his music with the style or tone of previous MCU films, and "in fact they encouraged me to go in my direction, so there were never any handcuffs put on me." In regards to the title character, Giacchino felt the key "was getting inside of him—not worrying so much about the magic stuff, more just thinking about who he was as a person, what he lost and then how that loss affected him. For me it's a very sad story, and a lot of the music has this very melancholy feel to it." To particularly differentiate the score, and help create a "mystical mood", Giacchino used a harpsichord and an electric sitar.

Guardians of the Galaxy Vol. 2
Bates was confirmed to be returning for the second Guardians film, Guardians of the Galaxy Vol. 2, in August 2015, and began composing by that December for Gunn to once again film to. On using this technique again on the sequel, Bates said, "We’ve gone even further down that road ... I would rather establish the DNA of our music prior to post-production when everything’s so frenetic so that we can work on themes and establish melodies that are original to the film." Bates reprises his theme for the Guardians.

Spider-Man: Homecoming
While promoting Doctor Strange in early November 2016, Feige accidentally revealed that Giacchino would be returning to compose the score for Spider-Man: Homecoming. Giacchino soon confirmed this himself. Giacchino reprises Silvestri's Avengers theme.

Thor: Ragnarok
By August 2016, Mark Mothersbaugh was set to score the third Thor film. Mothersbaugh reprises Patrick Doyle's themes from Thor and Brian Tyler's themes from Thor: The Dark World and Avengers: Age of Ultron, as well as Joe Harnell's "The Lonely Man" theme from The Incredible Hulk series.

Black Panther
Wanting to put a "personal stamp" on Black Panther and differentiate it from other MCU films, director Ryan Coogler looked to bring back several of his previous collaborators to work on the film, including composer Ludwig Göransson, whom he had worked with on Fruitvale Station and Creed.

Avengers: Infinity War
Silvestri announced in June 2016 that he would be returning to score Avengers: Infinity War. Initially, Silvestri had reservations about writing the film's score, feeling it would be difficult to collaborate with two directors and work towards a single vision. During their first meeting, Silvestri discussed reprising themes from characters throughout the series; having last worked on The Avengers in 2012, many characters had received new themes and motifs since then. Ultimately, Silvestri and the Russo brothers opted not to reprise most of these themes, feeling it would make the score too distracting. Nevertheless, Silvestri reprised Göransson's theme for Black Panther when the Avengers head to Wakanda, and went on to reprise numerous character themes in Endgame, including those for Captain America, Ant-Man, Doctor Strange and Captain Marvel. 

Despite not reprising many themes, Silvestri does bring back several of his own original motifs. Perhaps the most notable is his Avengers theme, which was used extensively in the film's marketing. The theme is reused sparingly in the film, typically during major moments such as Captain America's return in "Help Arrives" and Thor's arrival in Wakanda in "Forge". Silvestri also reprised his theme for the Tesseract, which was used numerous times in Captain America: The First Avenger and The Avengers. In Infinity War, the Tesseract motif is repurposed into a theme for the Infinity Stones in general. Silvestri initially considered making separate themes for each stone, but repurposed the original theme instead. The theme returns numerous times in the score, such as in "No More Surprises", "Family Affairs", "A Small Price" and "Morning After". A brief statement of Silvestri's original Captain America theme is reprised at the end of "Field Trip". 

Silvestri introduced several new themes for the film's score, most notably a theme for Thanos. Rather than create a bombastic, evil theme for Thanos, Silvestri instead composed a dark, brooding theme that's first introduced in "Travel Delays", and is woven through the rest of the score as a texture to establish Thanos's threat. The theme also bears slight semblance, perhaps in its instrumentation, to Loki's theme from The Avengers.

Ant-Man and the Wasp
In June 2017, Reed confirmed that Beck would be returning to score Ant-Man and the Wasp.

Captain Marvel
In June 2018, Pinar Toprak announced that she would score Captain Marvel, the first female composer for the MCU. Toprak reprises Silvestri's Avengers theme.

Avengers: Endgame
Silvestri announced in June 2016 that he would be returning to score Avengers: Endgame. The score for Endgame would become the first Avengers film to reprise the established themes for Doctor Strange, Captain Marvel, and Ant-Man. "More Problems", a track from Pinar Toprak's Captain Marvel score, was reprised for when Danvers destroys Thanos's ship. As he did with Infinity War, Silvestri reprised the Infinity Stones motif in "The How Works", "So Many Stairs", "In Plain Sight" and "Gotta Get Out". The thematic material in "No More Surprises" from Infinity War is reprised in "I Figured It Out" to depict the relationship between Tony and Morgan Stark. Silvestri reused significant parts of Infinity War tracks "A Small Price", "Even For You" and "Morning After" in Endgame tracks "Destiny Fulfilled", "Not Good" and "Gotta Get Out", respectively, to mirror Gamora and Black Widow's sacrifices. A dramatic variant of "Porch", the violin piece from the end of Infinity War, plays as Thor leaves Thanos's homestead to depict how Thanos's victory remains.

In addition, Silvestri reprises various themes from The Avengers as well. Parts of "A Promise" are repurposed in "One Shot". The ending of "Don't Take My Stuff" is repurposed in "I Can't Risk This", when Future Cap fights Past Cap. Black Widow's motif, which debuted in tracks such as "Red Ledger", "Interrogation" and "A Little Help", is briefly reprised for the opening of "I Was Made For This" as the team mourns Black Widow. In addition, the opening of "I Was Made For This" is repurposed from "They Called It"; the motif first played when the Avengers mourned Phil Coulson, and returns when they mourn Black Widow. The ending of "I Got A Ride" is reprised in "Portals"; the track traditionally plays during a long take of the Avengers fighting. Parts of "Seeing, Not Believing" are reprised during the final battle in the track "Get This Thing Started". "The One", which plays when Iron Man takes the Infinity Stones, reprises the theme from "One Way Trip" when Iron Man releases the nuke in space. Another portion of "One Way Trip" is reused when Thanos's army disintegrates. 

Silvestri reworked numerous tracks from Captain America: The First Avenger. The "Captain America Main Titles" are reprised in "Perfectly Not Confusing", when Tony returns Cap's shield. Parts of "Invasion" and "VitaRays" are reprised in "Tunnel Scape" and "I Can't Risk This". The ending of "Factory Inferno" plays when Cap grabs Mjolnir, and the first half of "Motorcycle Mayhem" plays when Cap wields Mjolnir against Thanos; both reprises are contained in the track "Worth It". Silvestri also reprised "This Is My Choice" when Cap passes on his shield and mantle to Sam Wilson.

Spider-Man: Far From Home
In October 2018, Giacchino was confirmed to return to score Spider-Man: Far From Home. As he did with Spider-Man: Homecoming, Giacchino reprises Silvestri's Avengers theme twice in the score. He also reprises the Homecoming Spider-Man theme, which has been modified to sound more heroic and represent his growth as a hero. Giacchino also reprised his Iron Man theme during a conversation between Peter and Mysterio. This marks the second time that an Iron Man theme has been reprised in an MCU film – the first was in Avengers: Age of Ultron, when Brian Tyler reprised his Iron Man 3 theme.

Giacchino wrote new themes for S.H.I.E.L.D. (which bears slight semblance to the Avengers theme), Mysterio, and the romance between Peter and MJ. Mysterio's theme bears semblance to the Doctor Strange theme, which Giacchino also wrote. The instrumentation of the theme is also similar. The theme is reprised many times in the score in a heroic context, but eventually becomes more bombastic and malevolent after Mysterio's intentions unfold.

Phase Four

Black Widow
By May 2020, Lorne Balfe was scoring Black Widow, replacing the original composer Alexandre Desplat. The film score was released on July 9, 2021.

Shang-Chi and the Legend of the Ten Rings
In June 2021, Joel P. West was revealed to be composing the score for Shang-Chi and the Legend of the Ten Rings. West has scored director Destin Daniel Cretton's previous films I Am Not a Hipster, Short Term 12, The Glass Castle and Just Mercy. The film score was released on September 1, 2021.

Eternals
Ramin Djawadi composed the score for Eternals, marking his second time scoring an MCU film, after Iron Man. The film score was released on November 3, 2021.

Spider-Man: No Way Home
By November 2020, Spider-Man composer Michael Giacchino was set to return for No Way Home. The film score was released on December 17, 2021. The soundtrack also features music from previous Spider-Man soundtracks by other film composers including Hans Zimmer, James Horner and Danny Elfman, as well as Giacchino's theme for Doctor Strange.

Doctor Strange in the Multiverse of Madness
By October 2019, original Doctor Strange composer Michael Giacchino was set to return for Multiverse of Madness. However, following the departure of original director, Scott Derrickson in January 2020, with Sam Raimi being brought on in April 2020, it was announced that Danny Elfman was brought on board to replace Giacchino as composer for the film by February 2021.

Thor: Love and Thunder
In December 2021, Michael Giacchino revealed he would scoring Thor: Love and Thunder, replacing Mark Mothersbaugh from Ragnarok. Giacchino ultimately composed the score with Nami Melumad, with themes by Giacchino.

Black Panther: Wakanda Forever
By September 2021, it was confirmed that original Black Panther composer Ludwig Göransson would return for Wakanda Forever.

Phase Five

Ant-Man and the Wasp: Quantumania
By July 2022, it was confirmed that Ant-Man composer Christophe Beck would return for Ant-Man and the Wasp: Quantumania. He previously scored the previous two films, WandaVision and Hawkeye.

Guardians of the Galaxy Vol. 3
In October 2021, John Murphy was revealed to be scoring the film, replacing Tyler Bates from previous Guardians films. Murphy also composed the score to Gunn's film, The Suicide Squad.

The Marvels
By January 2022, Laura Karpman, the composer of What If...? and Ms. Marvel was set to compose the score to The Marvels.

Television series

Marvel Television

Agents of S.H.I.E.L.D.

For Marvel's first television series set in the MCU, the Whedon-created Agents of S.H.I.E.L.D., frequent genre television series composer Bear McCreary signed on to compose the score. "The series centers on the behind-the-scenes people, their heroism and their quirks," McCreary explained, "As such, the music I wrote is heroic and, at times, quirky and offbeat." McCreary spoke at length with Whedon "about the challenge of creating a score that is big enough in its orchestral presence that it feels cinematic and feels at home in the Marvel Cinematic Universe. It also must capture the intimate human characteristics that define this series. In editorial, it became clear that simply tracking in typical big 'superhero movie' music wasn’t going to work. So Joss helped guide me to find a sound that lives a little in both worlds." McCreary worked with several soloists throughout the series, including Oingo Boingo guitarist Steve Bartek; vocalist Raya Yarbrough; composer Jeremy Zuckerman playing the gu zheng for "Girl in the Flower Dress"; and cellist Eric Buyers for when "the cellist" character Audrey performs in "The Only Light in the Darkness".

In addition to his orchestral music for the series, McCreary intertwined "these intricate symphonic layers ... with complex synthesizer programming, giving the score a modern edge." He described this programming as "clean", with "warm, round tones, built from simple sine waves with rudimentary reverb, delay and filters added for personality." With the second season, McCreary permanently expanded the brass section and "thinned out" the woodwinds section to give the orchestra "more weight in the lower frequencies", matching the darker look and tone of the season. He also cut back on his use of electric guitar, which was often used for Skye before she became an official agent; McCreary felt that "a common instrument that stood out from the epic orchestral texture associated with our true S.H.I.E.L.D. agents" had felt more natural for the then "lovable hacker, a relatable outsider from our world". He also evolved his synthesizer use, making them "mangled under heavy distortion, mutilated beneath waves of noise". After the introduction of the Inhumans, McCreary expanded the sound of the score "in a big way" for the third season, adding larger percussion, and many more trombones than previously, which required the recording space to be reconfigured. For "Maveth", McCreary used a 90-piece orchestra rather than the series' typical 50 or 70 players.

McCreary saw his main theme for the series, which also represents the central team of agents, as primarily being a theme for Phil Coulson. McCreary noted that "in one of the movies that would be inappropriate. You wouldn't do that for Coulson when Thor or Captain America are in the same story. But here Coulson is the hero ... It's all about him." McCreary initially wrote the theme in F major, "giving it a very triumphant sound", with one instance in the pilot diminishing it to F minor. Executive producer Jed Whedon "astutely pointed out that the minor version was more satisfying than the major version", and so McCreary 'tweaked' the theme permanently into F minor. ABC and Marvel allowed McCreary to use a full symphonic orchestra for every episode, and so there is "a full section of brass that's pounding out his theme when he comes out in his heroic moments." McCreary had to work harder than usual to make the theme heard, given that the show does not have a traditional title sequence. To accompany the main theme, McCreary wrote an ostinato "that doesn’t draw as much attention to itself as a full-blown melody. I use this catchy little riff to build up steam before sweeping statements of the Main Theme."

Mike Peterson's theme is most commonly performed on a solo electric guitar—McCreary felt that "the image of a single guitar player trying to hold his own against a 90-piece orchestra is a nice metaphor for how Mike must feel"—which is "consumed by distorted synthesizers and low brass" whenever the darker or more unstable sides of the character's superpowers are shown. McCreary also introduced a theme for the mysterious Centipede group in the pilot. "To imply the centipede-nature of the theme," McCreary "used ten notes, divided into two groups of 5. Played on delicate bells and de-tuned piano, the percussive nature of the notes evokes two rows of tiny insect feet crawling across a string." This theme also comes to represent the group's leader, the Clairvoyant. The emotional bond between the central characters is represented by "The Agents" theme, a much more intimate and accessible idea than the main theme. McCreary described the theme as unfolding "essentially like a pop-song, with a simple A-B-A-A structure". The Skye theme is most clearly heard in emotional moments dealing with that character's backstory, but also appears in many other variations, including brief, romantic statements to highlight her early relationship with Grant Ward. Fitz and Simmons' theme is " less melodic than the other themes, and more motivic. It’s essentially an ostinato that rolls over itself again and again, evolving into subtly different variations with each turn through the pattern. This musically emulates their speaking pattern, where they are constantly stumbling over one another and saying the same thing in slightly different ways." "The Hub" introduces the audience (and Skye) to "Big S.H.I.E.L.D.", as opposed to Coulson's small team, which McCreary gave its own, more militaristic theme. The theme for John Garrett has two parts, an ostinato and a melody, and "represents his adventurous personality, designed to be fun, bouncy and as far away from ominous as possible".

The episode "Turn, Turn, Turn" reveals to the series' characters that Hydra has infiltrated S.H.I.E.L.D. For much of the episode, they believe that Agent Victoria Hand, who was introduced in "The Hub", is a Hydra agent, and so the Big S.H.I.E.L.D. theme functions as the series' Hydra theme. Once John Garrett is revealed to be the traitor, and the Clairvoyant, the Centipede became the new Hydra theme, though McCreary continued to use his Garrett theme rather than outright replace it with the Hydra theme as Bill Paxton's "performance after being revealed as the Clairvoyant is even more fun and energetic. So, his theme still fits him perfectly, it just shows us a different side of his personality." With the second season came new Hydra characters, and their new MacGuffin, the Obelisk, for which McCreary wanted to use a Hydra theme. Feeling that his previous themes had become too complicated during the first season, and were too tied to that season's narrative, McCreary composed a new Hydra theme, which "in true bad-guy-theme fashion ... is constructed from distantly related minor chords, and contains lots of close intervals."

McCreary created his own theme for the Tesseract, "an ominous melodic line that shifts between two distantly related minor chords", and for Asgard, "like an old fanfare, a melody that capture[s] the majesty of Asgardian nobility" though it is generally performed as a "smaller version" since the series is still "rooted in reality". However, when Peggy Carter makes guest appearances on the series through flashbacks, McCreary quotes Christopher Lennertz's Agent Carter theme. McCreary said on this, "I was excited for the opportunity to incorporate his music into my S.H.I.E.L.D. score, because it further cements the Marvel [Cinematic] Universe together as a coherent whole ... Chris was thrilled and sent me his scores for reference."

Agent Carter
In June 2014, after a television series extension of the One-Shot Agent Carter was ordered by ABC, the short's composer Christopher Lennertz talked about the possibility of him being involved with the series saying Louis D'Esposito, the One-Shot director also involved with the series, wanted Lennertz involved, before officially signing on to compose for the series that September. On his music for the series, Lennertz said, "I get to mix a lot of things that don’t often get to go together in terms of period, music, jazz, trumpet, mixed with orchestra, mixed with electronics and brushes on a drum set and things." He researched "what was going on between '46 and 1950 and what it was that would be part of that era ... I knew Count Basie. I knew Glenn Miller, all those things were happening at the time, but then we also figured out that it was sort of changing from big band to smaller jazz ensembles." This led to Lennertz focusing a lot on trumpets for Peggy Carter's sound, "which makes a lot of sense because it’s also very sneaky, and it lends itself to espionage and that kind of thing". Lennertz introduced a folk choral piece performed by a Russian men's choir during "The Iron Ceiling".

Daredevil
John Paesano sought out the composer role for the first Marvel-Netflix series, Daredevil, after he had previously worked with showrunner Steven S. DeKnight on a proof of concept. After successfully auditioning for the job, Paesano joined the series several weeks into post-production, and had to provide around 25–30 minutes of music per episode. He averaged "around an episode every four or five days". DeKnight "had a very clear vision of what he wanted. He wanted to really keep the show grounded and he wanted to make it feel real and not so fantastical like some of the other Marvel properties were. He wanted music you could feel and not necessarily hear. We cut the score to be minimalistic." Once Daredevil gets his superhero costume at the end of the first season, "the music starts to change color and we start to get more in to that Marvel universe." Due to his schedule and the style of the score, Paesano ultimately used mostly electronic sounds and music, but did try to add acoustic instruments, such as cellos, where possible to have more of a hybrid sound, often using these in non-traditional ways. Instead of more traditional percussion, Paesano used a low pulse throughout the series, emulating a heartbeat since the titular character often listens to people's heartbeats with his heightened senses. Paesano took inspiration from James Newton Howard's Michael Clayton score for the series' lawyer-oriented scenes.

On returning for the series' second season, with new showrunners Douglas Petrie and Marco Ramirez (who had worked with DeKnight on the first season), Paesano felt that the two "really were true to what we were trying to do" with the first season, but the score still changed to reflect the new elements of season two "that we had to acknowledge. Obviously we have two characters being introduced, we have the Punisher and Elektra, and they both have their own backstories, their own interactions with Matt Murdock, so there are way more branches in this season than there were last season ... we just had to broaden the score to handle some of these different stories." Paesano continued, "even though there are these new stories, it's still in the same Hell’s Kitchen atmosphere that we’re creating. So there's definitely differences, but it's not like we all of the sudden went into John Williams territory ... it's definitely a very grounded show but it definitely jumps up a couple levels." Paesano worked closely with the series' sound design team, spotting episodes with them to coordinate where "we were going to hit what" and "maintain that definable aspect of New York" and its sound.

For his audition, Paesano created a demo which included a simple piano motif. Though this material would usually not be used in the final score, in this instance Paesano took the motif and converted it into a main theme for the series, which becomes the theme for Daredevil in the show. The final theme was co-composed by Braden Kimball. The first episode ends with a montage that the editors originally temped with a song, but DeKnight wanted to use original music instead. Paesano subsequently wrote a more "songish" version of the main theme for the sequence, with a basic verse-chorus-verse structure, and instrumentation such as guitars and a drum kit to retain the feel and energy of the originally chosen song. Besides the main theme, Paesano tended to focus more on "a feel and a tone and a sound" rather than Star Wars-style motifs and "heavy, thematic, melodic elements". The approach for villain Wilson Fisk was to juxtapose "this big bullish threatening character" with "light and sparse and elegant" classical music. For when his "evil twisted side" shows through, Paesano "took classical pieces of music and I twisted them up and played them backwards or redid some of the harmony or put them through distortion and created a classical vibe but really mangled and twisted". For Stick, Paesano used a cello bow on the neck of the cello, a technique called col legno, to replicate the sound of the blind man's cane. Paesano described his "themes" for Punisher and Elektra in the second season as "angry" and "mystical" sounding, respectively.

Jessica Jones
At a San Diego Comic-Con panel in 2015, Sean Callery revealed that he would be composing the score for Jessica Jones. The series' showrunner, Melissa Rosenberg, asked for Callery based on his work for Homeland, which she felt sounded like it could serve Jessica Jones well. However, Callery's music for the latter ultimately became "something so completely and wonderfully different" once he started exploring the tone and "color" of Jessica Jones. Callery found that the more intimate and organic his music, the more it "clicked with the series". To match the series' psychological thriller and neo-noir tone, Callery used a "smaller ensemble, it's almost like a jazz score, but there's some very weird, gooey sound design elements that kind of come in". Callery was influenced by the style and works of Bill Evans for the score. Rosenberg often asked Callery to have the music "do less", such as when he scored a fight sequence as a big, percussive superhero scene, and Rosenberg felt that even then the series should feel intimate; she suggested Callery just use a regular drum kit for the fights instead. Callery's assistant Jamie Forsyth also contributed to the music for the series.

Callery did not begin composing the series' main theme until after reading two or three scripts, and did not see the opening graphics until after the second episode, at which point he had "a framework for a theme that [he] hoped would work". At this time, Callery said he started "fooling around" with ideas for the theme, and eventually settled on one that he felt had a "sneaky and fun" quality, adding, Jessica Jones "has dry humor, a real edge to her. But there was something to this character that had a little whisker of playfulness in there, like a cat or something." After creating the theme, Callery expanded it, adding a "fun" rhythmic quality, and eventually fully orchestrating it to include a piano, which he played himself, as well as instruments such as the acoustic bass, and additional sound design. Regarding the electric guitar's entrance, Callery pointed out that it got "bigger there because as I looked at the graphics, the lights got a little more strobe-y. So that's when I decided the electric guitar might be a kind of neat add there so that the whole piece will arc a little more."

Jessica Jones has several personal themes that Callery "wove throughout the series", which he found to be most effective when played on solo instruments—"Whether they were guitar or solo piano, we always found that when the textures and the orchestration were minimal, soloistic, and expressive it just hit the right tone." One theme for the character represents "a light inside of her that is untouched by the cruelties that have befallen her. I stopped short of saying that it’s a happy theme, but it’s about her untouched pure self that she can trust in and is truly hers; it’s one of compassion and of caring." Another is more inline with her outward appearance and personality, which Callery described as tough and resilient, and "something that she totally owns". For the villainous Kilgrave, who is not seen in some of the series' early episodes, Callery "had to suggest his presence without actually seeing him. So initially he had a moody tone to him, which eventually started morphing into a darker theme" as the character physically appears and begins to play a larger role in the series.

Luke Cage
In April 2016, showrunner Cheo Hodari Coker revealed that Adrian Younge and Ali Shaheed Muhammad were composing the music for Luke Cage, with "a '90s hip-hop vibe". Coker had contacted Younge and Muhammad separately, asking if they would like to work together on the series, not knowing that the pair were already working together on an album. Younge and Muhammad composed the score as if they were creating 13 albums, one for each episode, with the music inspired by Wu-Tang Clan, Ennio Morricone, and Muhammad's group A Tribe Called Quest. Muhammad felt that the music was "about getting that hip-hop foundation and making sure those drums were as big as day", while Younge said, "we wanted to make something great. Not just for black people or minorities, just something great that just happens to be based on our culture." The duo composed around twenty minutes of music for each episode, composing the entire season's score in nine months.

Younge and Muhammad looked at all of the different sounds of Harlem, including hip-hop, jazz, blues, and psychedelic rock, to give each character "their own theme and their own sound" that was all still representative of the culture. For Luke Cage specifically, Coker noted that he is a character who understands the roots of the modern culture, and understands where modern Harlem and hip-hop sensibilities originated, so Younge and Muhammad looked to the beginnings of modern hip-hop for his sound. For Cage's more dramatic or emotional moments, vocalist Loren Oden was used as "kind of like [Cage's] inner voice". For the character of Willis Stryker, opera singer Brooke deRosa, whom Younge had often worked with before, was used. To reflect the character Cottonmouth's status in the series as a musician who primarily plays the Fender Rhodes, the composers "pretty much exclusively use Fender Rhodes keyboards for him. That is who he is." The most difficult episode for the composers was the fourth, which features flashbacks to Cage's time in prison. They felt that the episode's temp music was "all over the place, and it didn’t feel cohesive", and were unsure whether to illustrate the idea of an incarcerated black man using "old slave-blues-type" music, to go with a "Bernard Herrmann–Alfred Hitchcock-type scary vibe", or to stick with "straight hip-hop, '90s stuff". Younge offered that there was "some intense thinking, but it wasn’t necessarily difficult to execute once we figured it out."

Iron Fist
Trevor Morris was revealed to be composing the music for the first season of Iron Fist in late October 2016. The producers of the series wanted a "modern" sounding score, so Morris focused on synthesizer sounds and made a rule that traditional orchestral instruments, such as strings and horns, would not be used for the series. He said that by "taking those heavy-hitters off the table, it leaves you to find a unique way to solve these problems. That sound is also very fashionable right now, which I think is great." Some of the synthesizer sounds were intended to acknowledge the title character's childhood iPod on which he listens to music from the 1990s. In terms of Asian influences on the score, Morris attempted to use several instruments to represent Asian culture, particularly for scenes set in a dojo or featuring Kung Fu, but "the producers didn’t like it. They thought it was too traditional." He ultimately used some Japanese flutes throughout the show, but after they were "heavily affected" digitally. Robert Lydecker replaced Morris as composer for the second season.

The Defenders
In February 2017, Paesano was announced as returning to compose for the miniseries The Defenders. In February 2017, John Paesano was announced as the composer for the miniseries, after previously composing for the first two seasons of Daredevil. Paesano felt "there was more license to push the envelope and lean a bit more into the orchestral colors" of each character since they were "dealing with outright superheroes that  audience is familiar with". His score, which was a hybrid of synthesizers and a 30-piece orchestra, borrows the "color" of each character's themes from their individual series "to remind viewers of their individual personalities". The music of Johannes Brahms is used throughout the miniseries, first in the second episode where Alexandra is shown listening to a performance of his First String Quartet by the Aeolus Quartet. The scene establishes Alexandra to be "a Brahms aficionado". The composer's First Symphony is then heard as the leaders of the Hand prepare to attack the Defenders in the miniseries' fifth episode. Finally, Alexandra listens to a defective recording of Brahms' Tragic Overture.

Inhumans
At the 2017 San Diego Comic-Con, Loeb announced Sean Callery as the composer for Inhumans. At the 2017 San Diego Comic-Con, Loeb announced Sean Callery as the composer for Inhumans, after he previously composed the score for Marvel's Jessica Jones. Callery recorded his score for Inhumans with a 68-piece orchestra, the largest he had ever worked with for television. He called his score "the most thematic I've been with any show I've worked on. At its core, it's about a royal family, so there are some grand themes for the kingdom and the family. Callery wrote an "adventurous" main theme for the series that was featured in the IMAX release, with a "very, very abridged version" used in the television episodes. Callery tried to use the show's music to differentiate between scenes set on Earth and those on the Moon, and took four or five days to compose the music for each episode.

The Punisher
In April 2017, Tyler Bates was announced as the composer for The Punisher.

Runaways
In May 2017, Siddhartha Khosla was hired to compose the music for Runaways. In May 2017, Siddhartha Khosla was hired to compose the music for the series. Khosla said that, due to his history as a songwriter, his scoring process involves "working on these song-stories and weaving them through different episodes". He described the Runaways score as being "completely synthesized", utilizing analog synthesizers from the 1980s, specifically the Roland Juno-60 and Oberheim Electronics' synths. Khosla compared the "alternative feel" of his score to Depeche Mode, adding "there is an element of rebellion, so sonically going for something that is a little bit outside the box, non-traditional, I felt was an appropriate approach. I feel like I'm making art on this show." Alex Patsavas serves as music supervisor, having done so on all of Schwartz and Savage's previous series. On January 12, 2018, a soundtrack from the first season consisting of 12 licensed tracks plus two by Khosla, was released digitally.

Cloak & Dagger
Mark Isham announced in May 2017 that he would compose the music for Cloak & Dagger.

Marvel Studios

WandaVision
In January 2020, Christophe Beck announced that he would score WandaVision. Robert Lopez and Kristen Anderson-Lopez wrote theme songs for some of the series' episodes. They previously worked with Beck on the music for Disney's Frozen franchise.

The Falcon and the Winter Soldier
In December 2020, it was reported that Henry Jackman will score The Falcon and the Winter Soldier.

Loki
By January 2021, Natalie Holt was set to compose the score for Loki.

What If...?
By October 2020, Laura Karpman was set to compose the score for What If...?.

Hawkeye
In September 2021, it was revealed that Christophe Beck would be composing the score for Hawkeye. Michael Paraskevas composes for the series as well.

Moon Knight
In March 2022, it was revealed that Egyptian composer Hesham Nazih was composing the score for Moon Knight, his first major English language project.

Ms. Marvel
In May 2022, it was revealed that Laura Karpman would be composing the score for Ms. Marvel.

She-Hulk: Attorney at Law
In July 2022, it was revealed that Amie Doherty would be composing the score for She-Hulk: Attorney at Law.

Secret Invasion
In February 2023, it was revealed that Kris Bowers would be composing the score for Secret Invasion and was working on the score at the time of the announcement.

Short films

Marvel One-Shots
Marvel's first two Marvel One-Shot short films, The Consultant and A Funny Thing Happened on the Way to Thor's Hammer, were both scored by DJ Paul Oakenfold.

Item 47
The third One-Shot, Item 47, had a bigger scope and budget than the previous shorts. Marvel approached Christopher Lennertz to provide a "big and fun and funny" score; Lennertz described the One-Shots as "a little quirkier than the movies, in terms of making sure that they’re fast and they usually have a little bit more of a comedic bent to it". Lennertz' score for the short is "rock-based", with a lot of electronics and guitars. For the opening bank robbery, "We had a big twangy low guitar theme, almost like a Jack White kind of a thing on guitar". At the end of the short, when money 'rains down', Lennertz paid homage to Ennio Morricone with vocals in a "classic spoofy" way.

Agent Carter
Lennertz, who returned to score the One-Shot, and D'Esposito, the director, wanted a more traditional, orchestral score for Agent Carter, with D'Esposito wanting to balance the period setting and modern Marvel superhero feel. D'Esposito referenced Johnny Rivers' "Secret Agent Man", "even though it was in the 60's" as inspiration. Lennertz felt D'Esposito "did a terrific job getting that [feeling with the One-Shot] and reaching that" while having "a James Bond secret agent sentiment to it too." To create the score, Lennertz "put together a big band, combined it with an orchestra, and added modern electronic and dub-step elements", to represent the 40s setting, the Marvel feeling, and the advanced technology, respectively.

All Hail the King
With All Hail the King serving as a spin-off/sequel to Iron Man 3, many crew members from the film worked on the short alongside returning actor Ben Kingsley, including composer Brian Tyler. He described his music for All Hail the King—which features a title sequence inspired by Dr. No, Charade, and Iron Monkey, as well as other exploitation films "ranging from obscure Kung Fu to funky Italian Horror"—as "retro vibed".

I Am Groot
Daniele Luppi composes the score for the I Am Groot, a series of five shorts featuring the character Groot.

Television specials

Werewolf by Night
Michael Giacchino composed the score for Werewolf by Night in addition to serving as director.

The Guardians of the Galaxy Holiday Special
The Guardians of the Galaxy Holiday Special was announced in December 2020. John Murphy joined as composer in January 2022, while also helming Guardians of the Galaxy Vol. 3 as the special and film's productions were intertwined.

Original songs

Films

"Baba Yaga Lullaby"
Ant-Man and the Wasp features an original song performed by David Dastmalchian, referencing the mythological figure Baba Yaga in Slavic folklore.

"Guardians' Inferno"
Guardians of the Galaxy Vol. 2 features an original song in the film's credits. Co-written by the film's writer and director James Gunn and score composer Tyler Bates, it was "meant as a sort of Guardians take on Meco's disco Star Wars theme ["Star Wars Theme/Cantina Band"]." David Hasselhoff was chosen as the vocalist because he is one of Peter Quill's childhood heroes, and Gunn was a fan of Hasselhoff when he starred on Knight Rider.

"Make Way For Tomorrow, Today"
Iron Man 2 introduces the 1974 Stark Expo, based on the 1964 New York World's Fair. Richard M. Sherman, who wrote many Disney songs with his brother Robert, wrote the original song "Make Way For Tomorrow, Today" to serve as the in-universe theme for the Stark Expo. Sherman described Howard Stark, the character who created the Expo, as "a cross between Walt Disney and Howard Hughes", noting that Disney was himself involved in the creation of the 1964 World's Fair. He continued, "The filmmakers wanted a Disney-esque song to be the theme song of the Stark Expo," admitting that the song was inspired by his own "There's a Great Big Beautiful Tomorrow", which was written for the Carousel of Progress attraction that Disney created for the World's Fair. "Make Way For Tomorrow, Today" is heard again in Captain America: The First Avenger, when an earlier version of the Stark Expo appears, with Sherman noting of the reprisal, "different style, same song". The rendition heard in Captain America: The First Avenger is once again heard as an instrumental version during the end credits of Avengers: Endgame.

"Star Spangled Man"

Captain America: The First Avenger features a montage of the titular character and a chorus line touring the U.S., performing a song-and-dance number to the patriotic song "Star Spangled Man". The song was written for the film by Alan Menken and lyricist David Zippel, and recorded by the Metro Voices. Menken had wanted to provide the score for the film as well, but was unable to due to scheduling conflicts, so they wrote the song before the film began principal photography (a process Menken would use on an animated film), and hoped that it would mesh with Alan Silvestri's score. Menken said the song "screamed out for Irving Berlin, in the sense of "This Is The Army, Mr. Jones" or "God Bless America". It should be patriotic and it should be fun. The goal was to come up with orchestration that felt authentic to the ‘40s, USO [experience]." Christopher Lennertz conducted a new arrangement of the song for the first season of Agent Carter, where it is used as the theme music of a 1940s Captain America radio drama.

A modern-day arrangement of the song is used in "The Star-Spangled Man", an episode of The Falcon and the Winter Soldier, where it is used as the music played by a marching band as John Walker, who now holds the mantle of Captain America, enters a stadium. The original rendition is reused in the first episode of Ms. Marvel, "Generation Why", played in the background of AvengerCon.

"The Ice Cream Song"
Doctor Strange in the Multiverse of Madness features an original song entitled "The Ice Cream Song", performed by Julian Hilliard and Jett Klyne as Billy and Tommy Maximoff, respectively. The song was conceived and written by Elfman, with lyrics by Waldron.

"Theme from Caged Heat 1985"
For All Hail the King, Drew Pearce created a fictional CBS 1980s television pilot titled Caged Heat (starring Ben Kingsley's Trevor Slattery character), and Feige encouraged him "to go off. The whole purpose of Trevor is to go off the rails." Feige and Marvel subsequently suggested that Pearce create a full title sequence for the pilot. Feige's love of film soundtracks "started when I had a little tape recorder and I would tape the themes to Simon and Simon and The A-Team and play it back, and those were all Mike Post", so Pearce contacted Post about using one of his old themes for the sequence. Because Post had sold the rights to all of the themes he had written, and felt that none of them fit the "Russian Magnum P.I." tone that Pearce was aiming for anyway, he offered to write a new theme specifically for the project. Post recorded the theme music on the same equipment he used for his iconic 1980s series' themes.

WandaVision

"A Newlywed Couple"
The episode "Filmed Before a Live Studio Audience" of WandaVision features an original theme song written by Kristen Anderson-Lopez and Robert Lopez, and was meant to evoke the "dawn of television". They included "an optimistic group of voices singing jazzily" about the love between Maximoff and Vision, and were thrilled to use words like "gal" and "hubby" as well as a "big musical pratfall" in the middle of the song. "Gal" is used along with a triplet to pull the "lyric and musical choice together" and make the theme sound like it was written in the late 1950s.

"WandaVision!"
The episode "Don't Touch That Dial" of WandaVision features an original theme song written by Kristen-Anderson Lopez and Robert Lopez. "WandaVision" is the only lyric in the song, as Anderson-Lopez and Lopez wanted to emulate the minimalist, repetitive, "cool jazz Bebop-inspired" theme songs of 1960s television series. They also gave "Mah Nà Mah Nà" by Piero Umiliani and the works of Dave Brubeck as influences.

"We Got Something Cooking"
The episode "Now in Color" of WandaVision features an original theme song written by Kristen-Anderson Lopez and Robert Lopez. The composers of the song were proud of the lyrics for the episode's theme song, with Lopez feeling the lyrics "One plus one is more than two" and "One plus one is family" were "the dumbest and funniest and most TV-like lyric we've ever written". Anderson-Lopez pointed out that the second time was originally "One plus one is more than three" but was rewritten to "One plus one is family" because it was felt the original could have been a spoiler. Anderson-Lopez was the main writer of this theme, choosing words that related to a pregnancy and setting up the complication of "what's happening here and then making it up as we go along. Also like it's us versus the world."

"Sokovian Lullaby"
The episode "Now in Color" of WandaVision also features a lullaby written by showrunner Jac Schaeffer and translated into the fictional Sokovian language by the series' language coach Courtney Young. Performed by Elizabeth Olsen, Schaeffer said the song was just about a mother singing for her child rather than any of the series' larger mysteries, and described it as a "sincere version of a TV sitcom theme song".

"Making It Up As We Go Along"
The episode "On a Very Special Episode..." of WandaVision features an original theme song written by Kristen-Anderson Lopez and Robert Lopez, which the composers thought was their favorite song that they wrote for the series since they grew up in the 1980s. Lopez felt the "craft of theme songwriting peaked in the '80s", with the themes being "longer... touchy-feely ballads". This was the style they chose to emulate with "Making it Up as We Go Along", and since the theme songs of the era were longer, it allowed the couple to "land the emotion of it". Lopez added it was easy for them to find those emotions because he and Anderson-Lopez have children the same age as Wanda and Vision's in the episode and they were also "trying to make things work even as the world kind of crumbles around us". It features musical nods to the theme songs of Growing Pains ("As Long as We Got Each Other" by B. J. Thomas and Jennifer Warnes) and Family Ties ("Without Us" by Johnny Mathis and Deniece Williams). Lopez and Anderson-Lopez said they were channeling 1980s rock and pop singers for the song, such as Michael McDonald, Kris Kristofferson, Huey Lewis, and Taylor Dayne. The song originally did not include "WandaVision" as a lyric, but it was added as the ending of the song after encouragement from Marvel to include it.

"Let's Keep It Going"
The episode "All-New Halloween Spooktacular!" of WandaVision features an original theme song written by Kristen-Anderson Lopez and Robert Lopez and performed by Anderson-Lopez and riot grrrl artist Kathleen Hanna, which Anderson-Lopez felt having Hanna perform on the track added "this incredible authenticity" to it. The composers found the 1990s to be the most challenging era to write a theme song for due to them both being at college during that decade when they did not have a television. The song went through three different sets of lyrics and was an alternative punk rock track that was similar to "Boss of Me" by They Might Be Giants, the theme song for Malcolm in the Middle, since a lot of theme songs in the 1990s were punk rock. Since the episode shows things beginning to unravel for Wanda, the couple wanted the theme song to also have "an element of chaos, and unraveling, and a feeling of, sort of, alienation" to it. The composers of the song found the 1990s to be the most challenging era to write a theme song for due to them both being at college during that decade when they did not have a television.

"Agatha All Along"

The episode "Breaking the Fourth Wall" of WandaVision features an original theme song written by Kristen-Anderson Lopez and Robert Lopez. The song is similar to the theme song for The Munsters and "The Addams Family Theme" from The Addams Family. The couple was drawn to the past monster-centric series' music in order to give Agatha's theme song a "witchy, ghoulish feeling" with "a little bit of an Oompa-Loompa tenor feel to it too". Hahn is the lead singer on the theme, with Lopez singing backup along with the other male backup singers from previous theme songs.

Other television series

"Bulletproof Love"
The first season of Luke Cage sees Method Man make a guest appearance in the episode "Soliloquy of Chaos", in which he witnesses the heroics of the title character. The artist then goes on to make an original rap song in the episode titled "Bulletproof Love", which he performs himself. The actual track was arranged by the series' composers, Adrian Younge and Ali Shaheed Muhammad, for Method Man, and includes much of the socio-political commentary that showrunner Cheo Hodari Coker wished to convey throughout the series. It is accompanied in the episode by a montage of "black men walking the streets in Cage’s signature 'bulletproof' hoodie".

"I Want Your Cray Cray"
In a flashback during the episode "AKA I Want Your Cray Cray" of second season of Jessica Jones, former child star Trish Walker is shown to have had a brief pop-star career, during which she released a song titled "I Want Your Cray Cray". Performed by Rachael Taylor, who portrays Walker in the series, and Kandi Marks, the song was described as "sufficiently addictive" by Taylor, who noted that the sequence was explaining why Walker is "going in a number of different directions ... She's been made to feel in her life that she was not respected. She was [a drug] addict. It emotionally explains a lot about what season two is".

"Save the City"
The episode "Never Meet Your Heroes" of Hawkeye features a musical number from the fictional Broadway musical titled Rogers: The Musical titled "Save the City", centered on the Battle of New York and written by Marc Shaiman and Scott Wittman. It was released as a single on November 24.

"Very Full"
The episode "Lamentis" of Loki features a drinking song (also known as "") written by Norwegian author Erlend O. Nødtvedt and musician Benedicte Maurseth in Norwegian and English and performed by Tom Hiddleston. While Nødtvedt and Maurseth created four verses of the folk song, only one was ultimately used in the episode. Hannah Shaw-Williams of Screen Rant commented that while the chorus was "cheerful and upbeat", the verse heard in the episode was "far more melancholy" with poignant lyrics that "captures Loki's self-imposed isolation and loneliness".

"Watcha Gonna Do (It's Up to You)"
The Agent Carter episode "A Little Song and Dance" begins with a dream sequence that begins in black and white, before transitioning to color in "true Wizard of Oz fashion" for a Broadway-style dance number featuring an original song from composer Christopher Lennertz and lyricist David Zippel, in conjunction with series executive producers Tara Butters and Michele Fazekas. Titled "Watcha Gonna Do (It's Up to You)", the song was performed by actors Enver Gjokaj and Hayley Atwell. On working with Zippel, Lennertz said, "It was such a thrill to collaborate on a song with David. His musical style blended well with the jazzy musical tone we were going for, especially on this episode."

Other

Marvel Studios fanfares
After Marvel Entertainment was bought by the Walt Disney Company and Marvel Studios became its "own entity", without other companies working with them as distribution companies, the studio commissioned a new production logo for their films and television series starting with Thor: The Dark World, the first film to feature solely the Marvel logo. Feige explained that "We didn’t want to re-invent the wheel [from the previous logo], but we wanted it to feel bigger, to feel more substantial, [and] like all great studio logos, you need a fanfare, and we’d never had that before." Therefore, Marvel commissioned Brian Tyler, who had just scored Iron Man 3 and The Dark World for them, to compose a new "spectacular" fanfare to accompany the logo.

When approaching the fanfare, Tyler looked not just at the films, but "Marvel as a whole...going all the way back from The Human Torch through" the comics. Because "there was very little time for the listener or the viewer to really  in on what's there musically", Tyler "needed something that could be played a little bit more simply as a melody. Then all the orchestration—you know, I wrote these string lines that are actually, have kind of a fantastical, more complex nature to it. That just supports a melody that is more of a whistler." Marvel agreed with this approach and worked with Tyler to hone the orchestration; "as the graphics were being done we really wanted to hit little moments with some sparkly shimmer and get it more specific." The main melody remained unchanged from Tyler's initial composition.

In July 2016, Marvel introduced a new logo focusing on the film studio and featuring imagery from the MCU, rather than Marvel in general and its history in comic books. To accompany the new logo, first seen on Doctor Strange, Michael Giacchino, the composer for Doctor Strange, composed a new Marvel Studios fanfare. For Spider-Man: Homecoming, the fanfare introduced with Doctor Strange was replaced by "Theme from Spider-Man (Original Television Series)", Giacchino's version of the theme from the 1967 cartoon series. A rock version of the fanfare was played in the opening of Thor: Love and Thunder, while a horror version was played in the opening of Werewolf by Night. Giacchino also composed the fanfare for the Marvel Studios Special Presentations.

Marvel Studios: Assembling a Universe
Tyler composed for Marvel Studios once again in March 2014, by providing the music for the television special Marvel Studios: Assembling a Universe.

A Mini Marvel
In February 2016, a commercial for Coca-Cola mini cans starring Ant-Man and the Hulk aired during Super Bowl 50. It was created through a partnership with Marvel, and directed by the Russo brothers. The ad was scored by Ant-Man composer Christophe Beck and Jeff Morrow, who had contributed additional material to Ant-Man.

Avengers Campus
The music for the Avengers Campus themed area at Disney California Adventure was composed by John Paesano, who referenced themes from the Avengers, Spider-Man, Doctor Strange, Guardians of the Galaxy, Ant-Man, Captain Marvel, and Black Panther films. A single entitled "Welcome Recruits" was digitally released by Hollywood Records and Marvel Music on April 22, 2022.

Other releases

Vinyl
In July 2016, Luke Cage showrunner Cheo Hodari Coker revealed plans for a vinyl soundtrack album for the series, to be produced by composers Adrian Younge and Ali Shaheed Muhammad. The vinyl release was made available from Mondo on October 7, 2016, pressed on yellow vinyl and with collectible artwork by Matthew Woodson. On October 8, Mondo announced that its entire initial pressing of the release had already been sold out, with further orders to begin shipping in late November.

On November 7, vinyl releases for the soundtracks to Daredevil season one and Jessica Jones season one were announced by Mondo, pressed on red and purple vinyl, respectively. Each release was limited to 3000 copies, also comes with collectible artwork by Woodson, and was made available on November 9 both online and at the Alamo Drafthouse Cinema in Brooklyn, New York. The latter is "the first theater in the Alamo Drafthouse chain to include a permanent record rack inside the theater’s bar where select Mondo vinyl releases will be available on the same day they are released online." To celebrate the release of the new soundtracks, Mondo held an event at the House of Wax bar in Brooklyn on November 9, selling copies of all three albums to a live DJ set by Younge. Additionally, Mondo released posters of Woodson's art on November 10, screen prints "featuring a layer of spot varnish to bring different elements of the illustration to life."

Mondo released the Iron Fist season one soundtrack on both green and black vinyl on August 18, 2017. The release once again included original art by Woodson, which was additionally released as a poster.

Leading up to the release of Avengers: Endgame, Mondo announced that they would be releasing vinyl copies for the soundtracks of all MCU films released up to that point, as well as Endgame. The first vinyl produced was for Ant-Man and The Wasp on April 24, 2019, featuring collectible artwork designed by Phantom City Creative and 14 previously unreleased bonus tracks, followed by Black Panther and Thor: Ragnarok.

Singles

Compilation albums

AC/DC: Iron Man 2
Director Jon Favreau had used songs from hard rock band AC/DC in the first Iron Man film, and had been inspired at an AC/DC concert to introduce Iron Man in the sequel during a concert-like event. Favreau said on the band, "What’s fun about them is they were the full-on real deal of heavy metal when I was in high school. They were as real deal as it got. They made some people nervous—people questioned whether they were devil worshipers or not. And now these days they put on the same show...and there’s a sense of humor about the whole thing....there’s even a strange gentleness to the music to me now, even though at the time it was as edgy as you get. It’s celebrating immaturity and youth" in a similar way to the character of Tony Stark. In January 2010, Marvel announced that AC/DC's music would be featured heavily in Iron Man 2 in a collaboration with Columbia Records, who released a soundtrack album for the film featuring 15 classic AC/DC songs.

Guardians of the Galaxy: Awesome Mix Vol. 1
In February 2014, director James Gunn revealed that Guardians of the Galaxy would incorporate songs from the 1960s and 1970s, such as "Hooked on a Feeling", on a mixtape in protagonist Peter Quill's Walkman, which acts as a way for him to stay connected to the Earth, home, and family he lost. When choosing the songs, Gunn read the Billboard charts for all of the top hits of the 1970s, downloading "a few hundred" songs that were "semi-familiar—ones you recognize but might not be able to name off the top of your head" and creating a playlist for all the songs that would fit the film tonally. Gunn then chose the songs for the film by listening to the playlist and being "inspired to create a scene around a song", or by having "a scene that needed music and I would listen through the playlist, visualizing various songs, figuring out which would work the best." Many of the chosen songs were played on set to help "the actors and the camera operators find the perfect groove for the shot", with David Bowie's "Moonage Daydream" the only song chosen and added during post-production. In addition to the Awesome Mix Vol. 1 album, Hollywood Records released a cassette version of the soundtrack on November 28, 2014, as an exclusive to Record Store Day participants. The cassette was the first from Disney Music Group since 2003.

Guardians of the Galaxy Vol. 2: Awesome Mix Vol. 2
Gunn said he felt "a little pressure" in creating the Awesome Mix Vol. 2 mixtape for Guardians of the Galaxy Vol. 2 "because so many people loved [the first film's soundtrack] and we went platinum and all that other stuff. But I feel like the soundtrack in the second one is better," with all of the songs chosen and built into the script by June 2015. In January 2016, Gunn revealed that he had chosen an additional Bowie song to appear in the film, but had cut the original scene it was featured in. The inclusion would have made Bowie the only artist to be featured on both mixtapes. With Bowie's death that month, Gunn hoped to find a way to include the chosen song elsewhere in the film as a "fair and appropriate" way to honor him, as Bowie was one of Gunn's idols. Gunn described the soundtrack as "more diverse" than that for the first Guardians, which had "a bunch of songs that maybe you heard but didn’t know the name of the song–you didn’t know the name of the singer. In this one, we have some really incredibly famous songs and then some songs that people have never heard."

Black Panther: The Album
Kendrick Lamar produced the film's curated soundtrack, along with Top Dawg Entertainment founder Anthony Tiffith. It was the first MCU soundtrack to "integrate multiple original recordings created specifically for the film". Black Panther: The Album was released on February 9, 2018.

Shang-Chi and the Legend of the Ten Rings: The Album
An album featuring a variety of Asian artists from 88rising was released for Shang-Chi and the Legend of the Ten Rings. In the same vein as Black Panther: The Album, these recordings were created specifically for the film. The actor for Shang-Chi, Simu Liu, provides vocals for one of the tracks.

Wakanda Forever Prologue
Ahead of Black Panther: Wakanda Forever release, an extended play album produced by Göransson was released on July 25, 2022. It features three songs by Tems, Amaarae, and Santa Fe Klan.

Black Panther: Wakanda Forever – Music from and Inspired By
In October 2022, a compilation album for Black Panther: Wakanda Forever was announced, for release on November 4, 2022, with the lead single Lift by Rihanna being released on October 28, 2022.

Reception

In October 2014, John Coggin looked back on the music of the Marvel Cinematic Universe so far for International Policy Digest. He felt that the music was a major failing of the shared universe, especially in comparison to other major franchises such as Star Wars and The Lord of the Rings, because of a lack of "strong fanfares" for the films' heroes and a lack of continuity between the different scores. He felt that Patrick Doyle's Thor was the best in terms of "thematic strength and unity", while other films did not develop their own musical themes in a memorable way, and found it "remarkable" that Brian Tyler completely discarded all of Doyle's themes. Coggin ended his piece by noting that the MCU was "still young", and "in time, Marvel can and should develop bolder themes for its individual heroes. It should establish some thematic continuity between films." Emmet Asher-Perrin, writing for Tor.com, discussed the issue of musical continuity further. She pointed out how continuity between films was such an important aspect of the MCU for Marvel, and therefore found it confusing that the "same consistency wasn’t applied to their soundtracks". Raising numerous examples of other franchises recalling thematic material to great effect, Asher-Perrin opined that the lack of continuity in the scores was not only "off-putting", but a missed opportunity for Marvel and the cohesiveness of the franchise.

Christian Clemmenson of Filmtracks.com agreed that the scores for the Marvel films "always struggled to form any kind of cohesive identity". He felt that Silvestri had been the most successful composer at creating memorable themes, and saw Tyler's work for Iron Man 3 and Thor: The Dark World as strong in establishing an appropriate tone for the franchise by "combining the masculinity of the Hans Zimmer blockbuster expectations from the studio with the Jerry Goldsmith rhythmic flair that actually (still) works". Clemmenson did criticize Tyler's work on The Dark World for his "inexplicable" replacing of Doyle's themes with his own "generic" ones, and subsequently praised the composer's efforts on Avengers: Age of Ultron to maintain the sound that he previously established while reusing Silvestri's previous themes as well as his own. He also highlighted the way that Danny Elfman adapted and evolved Silvestri's Avengers theme for that film, "rather than simply arranging it for regurgitation". Despite this praise, Clemmenson ultimately only called the Age of Ultron score "functional", and felt that the way the music was edited and used in the film was "an absolute mess", an issue he saw with many of the MCU scores.

At Flickering Myth, Simon Columb responded to a description of Tyler's scores for Iron Man 3 and Thor: The Dark World as "alright" with an opinion piece titled "The Forgettable Soundtrack to Marvel’s Movies". He argued that film music is such a "core element" that the scores deserve more criticism than a dismissive "alright"; he felt that all MCU scores were "consistently below par ... the soundtracks have always felt unclear, confused and inconsistent." He also touched on the lack of continuity, lamenting the missed opportunity to "use the themes and music to carve out a consistent harmonic atmosphere". /Film's Jacob Hall focused on the quality of the MCU's music, describing it as "the musical equivalent of vanilla pudding. No single MCU movie features identifiable music and that’s a shame." Hall hoped that the hiring of Michael Giacchino, whom he called "one of the most talented and celebrated modern composers of music for film and television", and the rehiring of Silvestri, who he felt had composed the only memorable and recognizable theme with his "Captain America March", during Marvel's Phase Three slate of films would change this trend, particularly hoping that Giacchino could "bring some much-needed magic to the MCU".

In September 2016, the YouTube channel Every Frame a Painting, which analyzes films and the filmmaking process, posted a video essay discussing the music of the MCU. The video also highlights the lack of memorability for general audience members compared to franchises such as Star Wars and James Bond, and proposes several reasons for why this is: the tendency for the music to be background noise, or to be "hidden" behind other sounds such as voiceovers; how it closely reflects the events on screen, and so does not stand out or surprise the audience; and how it is often similar to other music, which the video blames on the temp process and filmmakers editing the film to the temp music before bringing in the composer, or asking composers to imitate the temp tracks. Saying that the music is not bad, just "bland and inoffensive", the video states that Marvel could improve their music by simply taking more risks with it, like putting more emphasis on the music without any other sound effects, or mismatching it with the visuals—for example, playing "emotional" music during an otherwise "humorous" scene to give more impact to the underlying feelings of the characters rather than their surface actions.

References

Disney music
 
Music by media franchise
Film and television discographies